is a mountain in Shōbara, Hiroshima Prefecture, Japan, with a height of 1,299 metres. It is within Hiba-Dogo-Taishaku Quasi-National Park.

See also
 Hibagon
 Mount Hiba (Shimane)

Hiba